There are at least 73 members of the Plantain order, Plantaginales, found in Montana.  Some of these species are exotics (not native to Montana) and some species have been designated as Species of Concern.

Family: Plantaginaceae

Bacopa rotundifolia, roundleaf water-hyssop
Besseya rubra, red kittentails
Besseya wyomingensis, Wyoming kittentails
Chaenorhinum minus, dwarf snapdragon
Chionophila tweedyi, Tweedy snowlover
Collinsia parviflora, small-flower blue-eyed Mary
Digitalis purpurea, purple foxglove
Gratiola ebracteata, bractless hedge-hyssop
Gratiola neglecta, clammy hedge-hyssop
Limosella aquatica, northern mudwort
Linaria dalmatica, Dalmatian toadflax
Linaria vulgaris, butter-and-eggs
Nuttallanthus texanus, blue toadflax
Penstemon albertinus, Alberta beardtongue
Penstemon albidus, white-flower beardtongue
Penstemon angustifolius, narrowleaf penstemon
Penstemon arenicola, red desert beardtongue
Penstemon aridus, stiff-leaf beardtongue
Penstemon attenuatus, taper-leaf beardtongue
Penstemon attenuatus var. attenuatus, sulphur penstemon
Penstemon attenuatus var. pseudoprocerus, taper-leaf beardtongue
Penstemon caryi, Cary's beardtongue
Penstemon cyananthus, Wasatch beardtongue
Penstemon cyaneus, dark-blue beardtongue
Penstemon deustus, hot-rock beardtongue
Penstemon diphyllus, two-leaf beardtongue
Penstemon ellipticus, egg-leaf beardtongue
Penstemon eriantherus, fuzzy-tongue penstemon
Penstemon eriantherus var. cleburnei, Cleburn's beardtongue
Penstemon fruticosus, shrubby beardtongue
Penstemon glaber, smooth beardtongue
Penstemon globosus, globe beardtongue
Penstemon gracilis, slender beardtongue
Penstemon grandiflorus, large-flowered beardtongue
Penstemon humilis, low beardtongue
Penstemon laricifolius, larch-leaf beardtongue
Penstemon lemhiensis, Lemhi beardtongue
Penstemon lyallii, Lyall beardtongue
Penstemon montanus, cordroot beardtongue
Penstemon nitidus, wax-leaf beardtongue
Penstemon nitidus var. nitidus
Penstemon nitidus var. polyphyllus
Penstemon payettensis, Payette beardtongue
Penstemon procerus, small-flower beardtongue
Penstemon radicosus, mat-root beardtongue
Penstemon rydbergii, Rydberg's beardtongue
Penstemon wilcoxii, Wilcox's beardtongue
Plantago canescens, hairy plantain
Plantago elongata, slender plantain
Plantago eriopoda, saline plantain
Plantago hirtella, Mexican plantain
Plantago lanceolata, English plantain
Plantago major, common plantain
Plantago patagonica, woolly plantain
Plantago tweedyi, Tweedy's plantain
Synthyris canbyi, Mission Mountain kittentails
Synthyris missurica, western mountain kittentails
Synthyris pinnatifida, cut-leaf kittentails
Veronica americana, American speedwell
Veronica anagallis-aquatica, brook-pimpernell
Veronica arvensis, corn speedwell
Veronica biloba, two-lobe speedwell
Veronica chamaedrys, germander speedwell
Veronica cusickii, Cusick's speedwell
Veronica longifolia, long-leaf speedwell
Veronica officinalis, gypsy-weed
Veronica peregrina, purslane speedwell
Veronica persica, bird-eye speedwell
Veronica scutellata, marsh-speedwell
Veronica serpyllifolia ssp. humifusa, brightblue speedwell
Veronica serpyllifolia ssp. serpyllifolia, thymeleaf speedwell
Veronica verna, spring speedwell
Veronica wormskjoldii, alpine speedwell

Further reading

See also
 List of dicotyledons of Montana

Notes

Montana